The Budușel is a right tributary of the river Budac in Romania. It flows into the Budac near Orheiu Bistriţei.

References

Rivers of Romania
Rivers of Bistrița-Năsăud County